The following is a list of amusement parks and theme parks that have been closed, demolished, or abandoned:

Africa

Egypt
 Luna Park, Cairo (1911–1915)

Rwanda
Kigali Park, Rwanda

South Africa 

 Ratanga Junction, Cape Town (1998–2018)

Tanzania
Umoja Children's Park, Chake-Chake, Zanzibar

Asia

Mainland China
Children's Amusement Park, Seven Star Park, Guilin
Dolphin Bay Dream Water Park, Pingyang County
 Grand World Scenic Park
Honey Lake Entertainment City, Shenzhen (1985–2011)
 Minsk World (2000–2016)
 Wonderland Amusement Park, Chenzhuang Village, Nankou Town, Changping District

Hong Kong SAR
Kai Tak Amusement Park, New Kowloon (1965–1982)
 Lai Chi Kok Amusement Park, Lai Chi Kok (1949–1997)
Luna Park, Hong Kong, North Point (1949–1954)
 Tiger Balm Garden, Wan Chai (1935–1998)

Indonesia 
Kampung Gajah, Bandung (2010–2017)
Taman Remaja Surabaya, Surabaya (1971–2018)
Wonderia, Semarang (2006–2017)

India 

 Appu Ghar, New Delhi (1984–2008)
 Dash n Splash, Chennai (1995–2012)

Iran
 Shahr-e Bazi, Tehran (formerly Luna Park, Tehran) (1970–2007)

Israel
 Kings City (2005–2015)

Japan

 China Park of Heaven Tenkaen (天華園), Noboribetsu, Hokkaido (1992–1999)
 Expoland, Osaka, Shinsekai (1970–2007)
 Festivalgate (1997–2007)
 Gulliver's Kingdom, Kawaguchi-machi, Yamanashi Prefecture (1998–2001)
 Kappapia, Takasaki Kannon-yama Recreational Park, Takasaki, Gunma Prefecture (1961–2003)
 Kejonuma Leisure Land (1979–2000)
 Koga Family Land, Shiga Prefecture (?–1988)
 Kurashiki Tivoli Park, Kurashiki, Okayama Prefecture (1997–2008) [in Japanese]
 Luna Park, Osaka, Shinsekai (1912–1923)
 Luna Park, Tokyo, Asakusa (1910–1911)
 Mukaigaoka Yūen, Kawasaki, Kanagawa Prefecture (1927–2002) [in Japanese]
 Nagasaki Holland Village, Nagasaki (1983–2001) [in Japanese]
 Nara Dreamland, Nara, Nara Prefecture (1961–2006)
 Niigata Russian Village, Agano, Niigata Prefecture (1993–2002)
 Orbi (2013–2020)
 Orbi Osaka (2016–2018)
 Poképark, Nagoya (2005)
 Seagaia Ocean Dome (1993–2007)
 Space World (1990–2018)
 Sports World Izunagaoka (1989–1996)
 Takakonuma Greenland (High Swamp Greenland), Fukushima (1973–1999) [in Japanese]
 Takakonuma Greenland (Mattari Park), Fukushima (1973–1999) [in Japanese]
 Takarazuka Family Land, Takarazuka, Hyōgo Prefecture (1960–2003) [in Japanese]
 Tama Tech (1961–2009)
 Tokyo One Piece Tower (2015–2020)
 Toshimaen (?–2020)
 Western Village (1975–2007)
 Wild Blue Yokohama (1992–2001)
 Wonder Eggs (1992–2000)
 Yamaguchi New Zealand Park (1990–2005)
 Yokohama Dreamland, Yokohama, Kanagawa Prefecture (1964–2002)

Kuwait
Kuwait Entertainment City (1984–2016)

Malaysia
MAPS Perak (2017–2020)
Mimaland (1975–1994)
Desa Water Park, Kuala Lumpur (2000–2016)
Wet World Wild Adventure Park Batu Feringgi, Penang (2013–2014)
Sand City Water Park Tanah Merah, Kelantan
Johore Safari World
SamaWorld, Genting Highlands

North Korea
 Pyongyang Folklore Park (2012–2016)

Palestine
 Crazy Water Park (2010)

Philippines
 Boom Na Boom Carnival (1987–1994)
 Fiesta Carnival (1975–2005)
 KidZania Manila (2015–2020)
 Old Nayong Pilipino (1970–2002)
 Fantasyland (closed due to financial issues)

Qatar
 Aladdin's Kingdom (1994–2004)

Saudi Arabia
 Al Hokair Land (2002–2021)

Singapore

 Adventure Asia Park
 Big Splash (1977–2016)
 Escape Theme Park (2000–2011)
 Fantasy Island (1994–2001)
 Gay World Amusement Park (1937–2000)
 Great World Amusement Park (1929–1978)
 New World Amusement Park (1923–1987)
 Tang Dynasty City (1992–1999)
 Wonderworld Amusement Park at Kallang (1959–1988)

South Korea
 Daejanggeum Theme Park (2004–2014)
 Okpo Land (1996–1999)
 Yongma Land (1980–2011)

Taiwan
Encore's Garden, Dakeng (?–1999)
Katoli World, Dakeng (1983–1999)
Formosa Fun Coast, Bali, New Taipei City (1989–2015)
Taiwan Studio City (1990–1999)
Poképark, Taipei (2006)

Thailand
 Dan Neramit, Bangkok (1976–2000)
 Happy Land, Bangkok (?–1977)

Vietnam
Hồ Thủy Tiên, Hương Thủy (2004–2007)
Saigon Water Park (1997–2006)

Europe

Belgium

Dadipark, Dadizele (1950–2002)
Land van Ooit, Tongeren
Lunapark Antwerp, Antwerp
Lunapark Antwerp 30, Antwerp (1930)

Bulgaria

 Sofia Land, Sofia (2002–2006)

Denmark
Fun Park Fyn, Aarup (1980–2006)
Karolinelund (1946–2010)
Sommerland Syd, Tinglev (1984–2012)
Velling Koller Fairytale Gardens, Brørup (1962–1980s) – now used as a camping site

Estonia 
Kadrioru Lõbustuspark, Tallinn (19??–2002)
Rocca al Mare tivoli, Tallinn (1996–2006)

Finland
 Ålandsparken, Mariehamn, Åland (1984–2002)
 Planet FunFun, Kerava (1991–1995)
 Wasalandia, Vaasa (1988–2015)

France
Archéodrome de Beaune
 Jardin de Tivoli, Paris (1795–1842)
 Le Bioscope (2006–2012)
 Lillom, Lomme (1985–1987)
 Luna Park, Paris (1909–1931)
 Magic-City (1900–1934)
 Mirapolis, Cergy-Pontoise (1987–1991)
Nautiparc, Chambéry, Savoie (1986–1995)
 Parc de la Toison d'Or, Dijon, Burgundy (1990–1993)[in French]
Toon's Land, Cap d'Agde, Languedoc Roussillon
La vallée des Peaux Rouges, Région parisienne
Zygofolis, Nice, Provence-Alpes-Côte d'Azur (1987–1991) [in French]

Germany

 Blub, Berlin (1985–2002)
 Luna Luna (1987)
 Luna Park, Berlin (1909–1933) 
 Luna Park Hamburg-Altona (1913, 1917–1923)   
 Luna Park, Leipzig (1911–1932)  
Safariland, Groß-Gerau-Wallerstädten (1970–1985) [in German]
 Spreepark (originally Kulturpark Plänterwald), Berlin (1969–2002)
Tivoli Berlin, Kreuzberg, Berlin (1829–1856)
 Alpamare Bad Tölz, Bad Tölz (1970–2015)
 Fränkisches Wunderland, Plech (1976–2013)
Freizeitpark Kirchhorst, Isernhagen (1971–1986) [in German]
Schwabylon, Munich (1973–1974) [in German]
Sea Life Abenteuer Park, Oberhausen (1996–2016) [in German]
Space Park, Bremen (2004)

Hungary
Budapesti Vidámpark (18??–2013)
Dunaújvárosi Vidám Park, Dunaújváros (1952–1993)

Ireland
 Butlin's Mosney, Gormanston, County Meath (1948–2000)
 Celtworld, Tramore, County Waterford (1992–1995)

Italy
Aquapark, Zambrone (1989–2007)
Miragica, Molfetta (2009–2018)

Netherlands
 Het Land van Ooit, Drunen (1989–2007) [in Dutch]
Yumble, Roermond
Verkeerspark Assen, Assen
De Vluchtheuvel, Norg

Portugal
 Aqualine, Altura
 Aquaparque, Lisboa (1989–1993)
 Aquaparque Teimoso, Figueira da Foz (??–2018)
 Atlântico Park, Loulé (??–2006)
 Beja Aquática, Beja (??–1992)
 Feira Popular de Lisboa, Lisboa (1943–2003)
 FunCenter, Lisboa (1997–2013)
 Ondaparque, Trafaria (1988–1996)

Russia
 Luna Park, St. Petersburg (1912–1924)
 Transvaal Park (2002–2004)

Spain
Casino de la Arrabassada, Barcelona (1910)
Europa Park, Benidorm 
Lagosur, Leganés (1989–1992)
Mediterráneo Park, Benidorm (1995–2002)
Parque de Atracciones de Montjuic, Barcelona (1966–1998)
Parque de Atracciones de Vizcaya, Galdakao (1974–1990)
Plutón Park, Vigo (1997–2002)

Sweden
 Kabe sommarland (1984–1995)

Turkey
Tatilya (1996–2006)
Wonderland Eurasia (2019–2020)

Ukraine

 Pripyat amusement park, Pripyat – abandoned after the Chernobyl disaster; the park's Ferris wheel, which is currently standing but not operating, serves as a poignant reminder of the massive human effect of the disaster.

United Kingdom

England

 The American Adventure Theme Park, Derbyshire (1987–2007)
Arena Funfair, Morecambe, Lancashire
Battersea Fun Fair, London (1951–1974)
 Belle Vue Zoological Gardens, Manchester (1836–1987)
 Brocklands Adventure Park, Cornwall (1977–2007)
 Camelot Theme Park, Lancashire (1983–2012)
 Children's Corner (1961–2004)
 Crinkley Bottom (or Blobbyland), Cricket St Thomas, Somerset (1994–1998)
 Dickens World (2007–2016)
 Dobwalls Adventure Park, Cornwall (1970–2006)
 Dinosaur Land (????–2009)
 Frontierland, Morecambe, Lancashire (1909–1999)
 Granada Studios Tour, Manchester (1988–1999)
 Killarney Springs, Cornwall (1990–2006)
Kinderland, Scarborough, North Yorkshire (1985–2007)
 Lapland New Forest (2008)
 Once Upon a Time, Ilfracombe, Devon (1990–2005)
 Peter Pan's Playground (1951–2010)
 Pleasure Island Family Theme Park, Cleethorpes, Lincolnshire (1993–2016)
 SegaWorld London (1996–1999)
 Tucktonia, Dorset (1976–1986)
 Wet N Wild, North Shields (1993–2020)

Isle of Man
White City, Onchan, Isle of Man (1908–1985)

Scotland
 Leith Waterworld (1992–2012)
 Loudoun Castle, Ayrshire (1995–2010)
 Marine Gardens, Edinburgh (1909–1939)

Wales
 Ocean Beach, Rhyl (1954–2007)

North America

Canada
 Bedrock City, Kelowna, British Columbia (????–1998)
Belmont Park, Montréal, Québec (1923–1983)
 Boblo Island Amusement Park, Amherstburg, Ontario (1898–1993)
Captain Bart's Science Adventure Park, Cavendish, Prince Edward Island
 Crystal Beach Park, Fort Erie, Ontario (1888–1989)
 Crystal Palace Amusement Park, Dieppe, New Brunswick (1990–2014)
 Dinotown (1975–2010)
 Dominion Park, Montréal, Québec (1906–1937)
Encounter Creek (formerly "Fairyland"), New Haven, Prince Edward Island
Erie Beach Amusement Park, Fort Erie, Ontario (1904–1930)
 Fantasy Gardens (1970s–2010)
 Happyland Park (1906–1922)
King Edward Amusement Park, Ile Grosbois Boucherville, Quebec (1909–1928)
Magic Valley Theme Park, Alma, Nova Scotia (1971–2014)
 Maple Leaf Village, Niagara Falls, Ontario (1979–1992)
Mill River Fun Park, Mill River, Prince Edward Island
Never Never Land, Hill Island, Ontario (1967–1980)
 Ontario Place, Toronto, Ontario (1971–2011)
Pyramid Place, Niagara Falls, Ontario (1979–1983)
Rainbow Valley, Cavendish, Prince Edward Island (1969–2005)
Scarboro Beach Amusement Park, Toronto, Ontario (1907–1925)
 Storyland (1966–2011)
Sunnyside Amusement Park, Toronto, Ontario (1922–1955)
Trinity Loop, Trinity, Newfoundland (1900s–2004)
Upper Clements Parks, Upper Clements, Nova Scotia (1989–2019)
Wild Rapids Waterslide Park, Sylvan Lake, Alberta (1982–2016)

Mexico

Mexico City
La Feria de Chapultepec (1964–2019)
Plaza Show, Lago de Guadalupe, Dinosaur Park is now a university, UVM Lago de Guadalupe (1980–1989)

Monterrey
Mundo de Adeveras (2005–2009)

Guadalupe
Bosque Mágico (1993–2022)

United States

Oceania

Australia

Australian Capital Territory

Canberry Fair, Watson

New South Wales
African Lion Safari, Warragamba (1968–1991)
Bullen's Animal World, Wallacia (1969–1985)
Dizzyland Fun Park, Salt Ash
 El Caballo Blanco, Catherine Field (1972–2007)
Fantasy Glades, Port Macquarie (1968–2002)
Leyland Brothers World, Karuah (1990–1992) – currently operates as The Great Aussie Bush Camp
Magic Kingdom, Sydney, Lansvale (1970s–1990s)
Manly Fun Pier, Manly (1931–1989)
Mount Druitt Waterworks, Mount Druitt (1981–1994)
Old Sydney Town, Somersby (1975–2003) – currently used for film and television production
O'Neill's Adventureland, Leppington – the park only operates occasionally with portable rides
Paradise Gardens, Cattai
Sega World Sydney (1997–2000)
Tomteland, Williamtown
White City, Rushcutters Bay
Wonderland City (1906–1911)
Wonderland Sydney, Eastern Creek (1985–2004)

Queensland
Adventure Parc, Tamborine Mountain
Amazons Aquatic Adventureland, Jindalee – closed down in 2001, the site has since become Centenary Quays, a gated community
Aquatic Adventureland, North Rockhampton
Grundy's Entertainment Centre, Surfers Paradise (1980–1993)
 Luna Park, Redcliffe Peninsula (1944–1966)
 Magic Mountain Fun Park, Nobby Beach (1962–1987)
Marineland, Main Beach
Mirage Grand Prix, Oxley
Nostalgia Town, Pacific Paradise
Olympia Theme Park, Alexandra Headland
Top's Amusement, Myer Centre, Brisbane – was on the top floor; included a roller coaster, a swinging pirate ship and bumper cars. Was deconstructed in 2000 to become the site for Event Cinemas
World Expo Park (1988–1989)

South Australia
 Dazzleland, Adelaide Myer Centre (1991–1998) – was on the top floor, included a roller coaster along with many other activities including a ball crawl
 Greenhills Adventure Park (1982–2016)
 Luna Park, Glenelg (1930–1935) – the rides for this park were sent to Luna Park Sydney upon its closure
 Magic Mountain, Glenelg (1982–2004) – this popular park boasted four waterslides built into an artificial mountain; has since been demolished as part of a redevelopment of the foreshore and replaced by a new park called The Beachouse
Puzzle Park, Murray Bridge – adjacent to the Callington exit on the South Eastern Freeway; now closed although many items of equipment still remain on the site

Tasmania
 Hobart Zoo, Hobart (1895–1937)
Serendipity Park, Devonport
Gumbles, Richmond

Victoria
African Lion Safari, Rockbank
Alpine Toboggan Park, Whittlesea – expanded and renamed Funfields; original toboggan runs still in existence.
 Dinosaur World, Creswick (1982–2002)
 Dreamland, St Kilda (1906–1909) – the park's Figure Eight rollercoaster remained in operation until 1914; the site is home to Luna Park, Melbourne today
 Hi-Lite Park, Geelong (1956–1985)
Kinkuna Country Fun and Fauna Park, Lakes Entrance
 Leisureland Fair, Langwarrin (1984–1992)
Rosebud Fun and Picnic Park, Rosebud
The Swagmans Hat Amusement Park, Corinella
Whistle Stop Amusement Park, Frankston
Wirth's Olympia Circus, Melbourne
 Wobbies World, Forest Hill (1970–1999)

Western Australia
Action Park, Mirrabooka
 Atlantis Marine Park, Two Rocks (1981–1990)
 El Caballo Blanco (1974–1995)
 Wanneroo Lion Park (formerly Bullen's African Lion Safari Park), Carabooda
Dizzylamb Park, Carabooda
 Elizabethan Village, Armadale (1977–?)
 Luna Park, Scarborough Beach (1939–1972)
Pioneer World, Armadale
 White City, also known as Ugly Land and Cooee City, Perth (?–1929)
 The Great Escape, Hillarys (?–2018)

New Zealand
Fantasy Land Amusement Park, Hastings – the site is now occupied by Splash Planet
 Footrot Flats Fun Park, Te Atatū Peninsula, Auckland, originally known as Leisureland (1984–1989)
 Luna Park, Quay Street, Auckland (1926–1931)
 Safari Land, Massey, Auckland closed in 1988.

South America

Argentina
 Italpark, Buenos Aires (1960–1990)
 Parque de la Ciudad (Ex Interama), Buenos Aires (1982–2006)

Brazil
 PlayCenter, Barra Funda, São Paulo (1973–2012)
 Luna Park, Rio de Janeiro (?–2006)
 Terra Encantada, Barra da Tijuca, Rio de Janeiro (1998–2010)
 Tivoli Parque, Rio de Janeiro (1973–1995)
 Wet 'n Wild Salvador, Salvador

Peru
 Luna Park, Lima (?–2007)

See also

 Amusement park
 Amusement park accidents
 Common names used by amusement parks:
 Electric Park
 Luna Park
 White City
 List of amusement parks
 List of closed rides and attractions
 List of former zoos and aquariums
 List of world's fairs
 Roller Coaster DataBase

References

External links
 Defunct Amusement Parks of Illinois Over 80 defunct Illinois amusement parks: history and photos.
 Defunct amusement parks
 10¢ A Ticket: The Stories & Glories of Old Amusement Parks, WBGU-PBS documentary about 21 amusement parks located in Northwest Ohio since the 1800s
 Abandoned amusement park ruins on moderndayruins.com
 "Old Amusement Parks" on AboutNewJersey.com

 
Amusement parks
Defunct